Sawgrass is a census-designated place (CDP) in St. Johns County, Florida, United States. The population was 4,880 per the 2010. This population change is a -1.3% decrease since 2000. The area is located in Ponte Vedra Beach. Sawgrass is home to The Players Championship (TPC), established in 1974. The tournament offers the highest prize fund of any tournament in golf.

Geography
Sawgrass is located at  (30.192742, -81.372668).

TPC Sawgrass Players Club 
This upscale community in Ponte Vedra Beach consists of 1,200 acres. Located between the Atlantic Ocean and the Intracoastal Waterway, Sawgrass Players Club, a gated community, holds 16 neighborhoods, a retirement community called Vicar's Landing, the Oak Bridge Golf and Country Club, and the famous golf course, the TPC Sawgrass.

Sawgrass Country Club 
Located in Ponte Vedra Beach, this residential area resides to the east of A1A. There are 38 smaller neighborhoods within the large gated community. Within Sawgrass Country Club, there is a private golf course with amenities and a beach club across the street.  Membership is required.

Demographics

Sawgrass comprises two subdivisions: Sawgrass Country Club and TPC Sawgrass Players Club. The total number of residences is 1,409 in Sawgrass Country Club and 1,564 in TPC Sawgrass Players Club for a total of 2,973. This calculation excludes Vicar's Landing retirement apartment community located in TPC Sawgrass Players Club. The median resident age is 56.6 years while Florida's median age is 41.8. Males make up 47.6% of sawgrass while females make up 52.4%. The population density is 1,600.4 people per square mile (617.5/km).

Monetary demographics 
The median income for a household in Sawgrass was $79,951 in 2015 which is $30,525 above the state average. Many residents make $200,000 or more a year (19%). In 2015, the average housing unit cost $338,755. Detached houses cost $386,262 and townhouses cost $168,720. Houses for sale range from $200,000 to $2,000,000. The common industries for males and females are finance and insurance.

Racial demographics 
Per the 2010 City-Data Website, Sawgrass is racially similar meaning diversity is scarce. The racial makeup includes:

 White - 94.2% (4,598)
 Hispanic - 2.6% (125)
 Asian - 1.4% (69)
 Two or more races - 1.0% (50)
 Black - 0.5% (22)
 American Indian - 0.2% (10)
 Other races - 0.1% (5)
 Native Hawaiian and Pacific Islander - 0.02% (1)

Education
It is in the St. Johns County School District.

The community is zoned to PV-PV/Rawlings Elementary School, Alice B. Landrum Middle School, and Ponte Vedra High School.

Additionally Palmer School (K-8) is nearby.

Community colleges
 Florida State College of Jacksonville
 Saint Johns River State College

Universities and four year colleges
 Flagler College
 Jacksonville University
 University of North Florida

References

Census-designated places in St. Johns County, Florida
Census-designated places in the Jacksonville metropolitan area
Census-designated places in Florida
Populated coastal places in Florida on the Atlantic Ocean